The 1928 Minnesota Golden Gophers football team represented the University of Minnesota in the 1928 college football season. In their fourth year under head coach Clarence Spears, the Golden Gophers compiled a 6–2 record and outscored their opponents by a combined score of 182 to 36.

Guard George Gibson and end Ken Haycraft were named All-Americans by the Associated Press and Look Magazine. Gibson, Haycraft and quarterback Fred Hovde were named All-Big Ten first team.

Total attendance for the season was 146,185, which averaged to 29,237. The season high for attendance was against Chicago.

Schedule

References

Minnesota
Minnesota Golden Gophers football seasons
Minnesota Golden Gophers football